Bence Bálizs (born 30 May 1990) is a Hungarian professional ice hockey goaltender who plays for MAC Budapest in the MOL Liga.

External links

1990 births
MAC Budapest players
Living people
Hungarian ice hockey goaltenders
Ice hockey people from Budapest